Ahmet Şâhin may refer to:

 Ahmet Şâhin (writer) (born 1935), Turkish author
 Ahmet Şahin (footballer) (born 1978), Turkish footballer